Wlicox Lakes are located in North Cascades National Park, in the U. S. state of Washington. The Wilcox Lakes are the origination point for the East Fork Nehalem Creek and the lakes were named for Paul B. Wilcox who was the first to discover them.

References

Lakes of Washington (state)
North Cascades National Park
Lakes of Skagit County, Washington